Anna Barnacka is a Polish astrophysicist and entrepreneur. She is known for her work on astroparticle physics.

Education 
She received her PhDs in astronomy from Nicolaus Copernicus Astronomical Center of the Polish Academy of Sciences in Warsaw, Poland, and physics from Paris-Sud University conducting her research at French Alternative Energies and Atomic Energy Commission in Paris, France. After earning her doctorates, Barnacka became a postdoctoral researcher at the Center for Astrophysics  Harvard & Smithsonian. She received a NASA Einstein Fellowship in 2015, during which she explored the phenomena of gravitational lensing and pioneered techniques for turning gravitational lenses into high-resolution telescopes.

Her research has also focused on very high energy astroparticle physics, where she has been a member of international collaborations, including the Cherenkov Telescope Array, VERITAS, and H.E.S.S. As of 2022 Barnacka has and h-index of 43 with over 7100 citations to her work.

Barnacka is founder and CEO of MindMics, a company presenting new tools to monitor vital signs related to cardiovascular health and wellness. Barnacka has patent applications associated with this work.

Selected publications

Awards and honors 
In 2012, Barnacka received the Copernicus Astronomical Center Young Scientist Award primarily in recognition of her 2012 paper in Physical Review.

In 2020, Barnacka received Nicolaus Copernicus Prize in the category of Cosmology and Astrophysics (an honor given once every five years) by the Polish Academy of Arts and Sciences  for the outstanding monothematic cycle of five manuscripts under the collective title: Development of a method of using gravitational lensing for astronomical measurements with high resolution. The work is summarized in the invited review manuscript inPhysics Reports.

References

External links 

Living people
Paris-Sud University alumni
Academic staff of Jagiellonian University
Women physicists
Polish scientists
Polish women in business
1984 births